Jason Rogers may refer to:

 Jason Rogers (publisher) (1868–1932), American newspaper publisher
 Jason Rogers (fencer) (born 1983), American saber fencer
 Jason Rogers (athlete) (born 1991), Saint Kitts and Nevis sprinter 
 Jason Rogers (baseball) (born 1988), American baseball player

See also
 Jay Rogers (1888–1964), Major League Baseball catcher